Verona Rag is an album by American jazz pianist Andrew Hill recorded in 1986 and released on the Italian Soul Note label in 1987. The solo album features three of Hill's original compositions and two jazz standards.

Reception

The AllMusic review by Scott Yanow awarded the album 4½ stars and stated "Hill, a true individualist, embodies the best in creative jazz".

Track listing 
All compositions by Andrew Hill except as indicated
 "Retrospect" - 14:25  
 "Darn That Dream" (Eddie DeLange, Jimmy Van Heusen) - 6:14  
 "Verona Rag" - 16:33  
 "Tinkering" - 4:22  
 "Afternoon in Paris" (John Lewis) - 6:25  
Recorded at Jingle Machine Studios, Milan, Italy on July 5, 1986

Personnel 
 Andrew Hill - piano

References 

Black Saint/Soul Note albums
Andrew Hill albums
1987 albums
Solo piano jazz albums